Featherstone is an unincorporated community in Prince William County, in the U.S. state of Virginia.

References

Unincorporated communities in Virginia
Unincorporated communities in Prince William County, Virginia
Washington metropolitan area